Down and Outlaws is a four-piece rock and roll band based in San Francisco, California.

History 
Down and Outlaws was formed by Peter Danzig (lead vocals and guitar), C.W. Danzig (bass guitar), Kyle Luck (guitar) and Jon Carr (drums) in San Francisco, California in 2013.

The band recorded its debut album Above Snakes at Dave Grohl's Studio 606 (Sound City) in December 2014, with help from producer John 'Lou' Lousteau (Foo Fighters, Teenage Time Killers, Fear, Against Me!, Iggy Pop And The Stooges) and Vanessa Silberman. The debut album was released on July 8, 2016 at The Great American Music Hall. The track "Obsession" was debuted by Guitar Player.

Down and Outlaws made their national television debut on Last Call with Carson Daly.

In September 2015 the band recorded the single "All is Well" with Converse Rubber Tracks Global in Vancouver at The Warehouse Studio with Jason Finkel(Green Day, Kanye West, Yellowcard).

The band has toured and played with acts including: Billy Idol, The Stone Foxes, Reignwolf, Black Pistol Fire, The Silent Comedy, Cancer Bats, Alex Mass of The Black Angels (band).

Down and Outlaws have played festivals including South by Southwest, Echo Park Rising, and most recently, Outside Lands Music and Arts Festival (LCD Soundsystem, Radiohead, Lana Del Rey).

Discography

Studio albums 
 Above Snakes (A Diamond Heart Production 2016)
 Gas Money (2019)

Extended plays 
 Backwards from the Dead (2013)

Singles 
 All is Well (Converse Rubber Tracks Global 2015)

References

External links 
 Official Site

Hard rock musical groups from California
Alternative rock groups from California
Musical groups from San Francisco